HaHaHa Production is a Romanian record label, launched in 2009 by prominent singer Smiley.

As of 2015, HaHaHa Production has also produced and co-produced singles for international artists, such as: In-Grid, Sway, Snoop Dogg, Flo Rida, Mario Winans, Cozi Costi, Junior Caldera and DJ Smash.

HaHaHa Production is composed of:  
 HaHaHa Video Production
 HaHaHa Management  
 HaHaHouse
HaHaHa Production is one of YouTube's official local partners, along with Roton, Cat Music, MediaPro Music and TVR. The first video uploaded to YouTube's local platform was the video for "Mi-ai intrat în cap" performed by Jazzy Jo feat. Dorian.

Notable artists 
 Andra 
 Cabron 
 Feli  
 Smiley
 Alex Velea

References

External links 
 

Romanian companies established in 2009
Record labels established in 2009
Romanian music
Romanian record labels